Natatolana flexura is a species of crustacean in the family Cirolanidae, and was first described by Stephen John Keable in 2006. 

It is a benthic species, living at depths of 100 m in temperate waters, off the Queensland, New South Wales and Tasmanian coasts.

References

External links
Natatolana flexura occurrence data from GBIF

Cymothoida
Crustaceans of Australia
Crustaceans described in 2006
Taxa named by Stephen John Keable